Oplodontha viridula, the common green colonel, is a European species of soldier fly.

Description
Body length 6–8 mm. Purple eyes in life with bands and spots. Thorax brilliant black, coarsely punctured and with short dull yellow pubescence. Scutellum entirely black with two yellow spines. Yellowish legs (female). Abdomen whitish, yellow or leaf green with all intermediate ranges;  black longitudinal dorsal median band also variable in shape and extent than the background pastel color. The larva is light or dark brownish with different longitudinal stripes or markings: on the dorsal side it has short, depressed hairs, on the ventral side the middle space of the segments have somewhat longish hairs. The length is 16 mm.<ref>Seguy. E. Faune de France Faune n° 13 1926. Diptères Brachycères.308 p., 685 fig.</ref>E. P. Narchuk in Bei-Bienko, G. Ya, 1988 Keys to the insects of the European Part of the USSR Volume 5 (Diptera) Part 2 English edition. Keys to Palaearctic species but now needs revision.

Biology
The habitat is wetland biotope, such as marshes, meadows with locks, salt marshes and river valleys- in humid places, on herbs, Phragmites, Cnicus Adults are found from the end of April to the beginning of October. Adults feed on pollen and nectar of Achillea millefolium'' ........

Distribution
Throughout the Palearctic.

References

Stratiomyidae
Diptera of Europe
Insects described in 1775
Taxa named by Johan Christian Fabricius
Articles containing video clips